Cernuella hydruntina is a species of small air-breathing land snail, a terrestrial pulmonate gastropod mollusk in the family Geomitridae. 

This species creates and uses love darts in its mating behavior.

References

 Bank, R. A.; Neubert, E. (2017). Checklist of the land and freshwater Gastropoda of Europe. Last update: July 16th, 2017

External links
 Cernuella hydruntina. AnimalBase

Geomitridae
Gastropods described in 1884